The Catholic Church in the South Sea (Oceania, excluding the national episcopal conferences of Australia, of New Zealand, each with dependencies, and of Papua New Guinea and the Solomon Islands) consists only of a variety of Latin jurisdictions, usually covering a whole island state (whether nation or overseas territory of a foreign power) or even more than one, none of which has a large enough episcopate to warrant a national episcopal conference, so they jointly form the Latin "Episcopal Conference of the [South] Pacific", headquartered in Suva (on Fiji). It comprises only: 

 five transnational ecclesiastical provinces, each headed by a Metropolitan Archbishopric, with a total of eleven suffragans: eight bishoprics and -exceptionally, as those are generally exempt- three pre-diocesan (an apostolic prefecture and two independent missions)
 one exempt diocese, directly subject to the Holy See, on Tonga.

There are no proper Eastern Catholic jurisdictions or quasi-diocesan Ordinariates, but the Byzantine Rite Ukrainian Catholic Church faithful are served by the Ukrainian Catholic Eparchy of Saints Peter and Paul of Melbourne, in and for all Australia, also covering New Zealand and further Oceania.

There are no individual papal diplomatic representations to several British, French, Australian, New Zealand and US overseas possessions (strictly speaking diplomatically covered by the home countries), but the Apostolic Delegation to the Pacific Ocean, headquartered externally in Wellington, New Zealand, covers American Samoa, French Polynesia, Guam (US), New Caledonia (France), Niue (New Zealand), Norfolk Island (Australia, pastorally under its Sydney Archdiocese), Northern Mariana Islands (US), Pitcairn Islands (UK), Tokelau (NZ), the U.S. Minor Outlying Islands (pastorally served by the Archdiocese for the Military Services of the United States) and Wallis and Futuna (France). It also deals with independent Tuvalu.
 
There is formally an Apostolic Nunciature as papal diplomatic representation (embassy level) to Fiji, but it is vested in the Apostolic Nunciature to New Zealand, in its capital Wellington.

There is formally an Apostolic Nunciature to Cook Islands, but it is vested in the Apostolic Nunciature to associated mother country New Zealand in its capital Wellington.

There is formally an Apostolic Nunciature to each of the following nations, but they are all vested in the Apostolic Nunciature to New Zealand, in its capital Wellington:
 Kiribati.
 Marshall Islands
 the Federated States of Micronesia
 Samoa
 Tonga
 Vanuatu.

Current Latin jurisdictions

Exempt 
 Roman Catholic Diocese of Tonga, on and for all Tonga

Ecclesiastical province of Agaña 
 Metropolitan Roman Catholic Archdiocese of Agaña, on and for Guam (US unincorporated territory) 
 Roman Catholic Diocese of Caroline Islands, on the Caroline Islands, for all the Federated States of Micronesia (Micronesia) and Palau
 Roman Catholic Diocese of Chalan Kanoa, on the Northern Mariana Islands and for the Commonwealth of the Northern Mariana Islands (U.S. territory)
 Apostolic Prefecture of the Marshall Islands, with see at Majuro, on and for the Marshall Islands (republic)

Ecclesiastical Province of Nouméa 
 Metropolitan Roman Catholic Archdiocese of Nouméa, on and for New Caledonia, French special collectivity) 
 Roman Catholic Diocese of Port-Vila, on and for Vanuatu, former New Hebribes
 Roman Catholic Diocese of Wallis et Futuna, with see at Mata-Utu, on and for Wallis et Futuna (French overseas collectivity)

Ecclesiastical Province of Papeete 
 Metropolitan Roman Catholic Archdiocese of Papeete, on and mainly for French Polynesia (French overseas collectivity), also for Pitcairn Islands (UK) 
 Roman Catholic Diocese of Taiohae o Tefenuaenata, also in French Polynesia

Ecclesiastical Province of Samoa–Apia 
 Metropolitan Roman Catholic Archdiocese of Samoa–Apia, on and for Samoa 
 Roman Catholic Diocese of Samoa–Pago Pago, on and for American Samoa (US)
 Mission Sui Iuris of Funafuti, on and for Tuvalu (formerly Ellice Islands)
 Mission Sui Iuris of Tokelau, on and for Tokelau (New Zealand)

Ecclesiastical Province of Suva 
 Metropolitan Roman Catholic Archdiocese of Suva, on and for Fiji 
 Roman Catholic Diocese of Rarotonga, on the Cook Islands, for those and Niue (both New Zealand-associated countries)
 Roman Catholic Diocese of Tarawa and Nauru, with see at Tarawa on Kiribati (formerly Gilbert Islands), also for Nauru (republic).

Defunct jurisdictions 
There are no titular sees.
 
Most defunct jurisdictions have current successor sees, except
 Apostolic Vicariate of Micronesia (Micronesia).

See also 
 List of Catholic dioceses (structured view)
 Catholic Church in Oceania
 Catholic Church in American Samoa
 Catholic Church in Cook Island
 Catholic Church in the Federated States of Micronesia
 Catholic Church in Fiji
 Catholic Church in Guam
 Catholic Church in Kiribati
 Catholic Church in the Marshall Islands
 Catholic Church in New Caledonia
 Catholic Church in New Zealand
 Catholic Church in the Northern Marianas
 Catholic Church in Samoa
 Catholic Church in Tonga
 Catholic Church in Tuvalu
 Catholic Church in Vanuatu
 Catholic Church in Wallis and Futuna

Sources and external links 
 GCatholic - Episcopal Conference
 GCatholic - American Samoa
 GCatholic - Cook Island
 GCatholic - Fiji
 GCatholic - French Polynesia
 GCatholic - Guam
 GCatholic - Kiribati
 GCatholic - Marshall Islands
 GCatholic - Federated States of Micronesia
 GCatholic - New Caledonia
 GCatholic - Norfolk Island
 GCatholic - Northern Mariana Islands
 GCatholic - Pitcairn Islands
 GCatholic - Samoa (independent)
 GCatholic - Tokelau
 GCatholic - Tonga
 GCatholic - Tuvalu
 GCatholic - Vanuatu
 GCatholic - Wallis & Futuna

South Pacific